The electromechanical coupling coefficient is a numerical measure of the conversion efficiency between electrical and acoustic energy in piezoelectric materials.

Qualitatively the electromechanical coupling coefficient, k, can be described as:

References

Vilnius University, Laboratory of Physical Acoustics

Dimensionless numbers
Condensed matter physics
Electrical phenomena